The North Macedonia men's national water polo team was formed in 1991, following the Republic of Macedonia's declaration of independence. Before 1991, the Republic of Macedonia was part of Yugoslavia, and its players participated in the Yugoslavia national water polo team.

The first major event that the team qualified for was the 2008 Men's European Water Polo Championship, finishing in 8th place.

Results

World Championship
2009 – 14th place

FINA World League
 2010 – 19th place
 2011 – 16th place
 2012 – Preliminary round

European Championship
2008 – 8th place
2010 – 12th place
2012 – 11th place

Universiade
2011 – Bronze medal

Current squad

Coach: Stevan Nonković

References

External links
Macedonian Swimming Federation

Water polo
Men's national water polo teams
National water polo teams in Europe
National water polo teams by country
 
Men's sport in North Macedonia